Nearpass House was a historic home located at Mill Rift, Westfall Township, Pike County, Pennsylvania.  It was built about 1820, and was a small -story, wooden dwelling of post-and-beam construction.  A lean-to addition was built about 1840, and the building was sided and roofed in the 20th century.  Maintenance was neglected, however, and it was demolished by the current owner, Paul Farrell, around 2007. Also known as the Knickerbocker House and the Padgett Homestead, after subsequent occupants, it was the earliest remaining building from the early settlement of Mill Rift.

It was added to the National Register of Historic Places in 1993.

References

Houses on the National Register of Historic Places in Pennsylvania
Georgian architecture in Pennsylvania
Houses completed in 1850
Houses in Pike County, Pennsylvania
National Register of Historic Places in Pike County, Pennsylvania